Pars intermedia is the boundary between the anterior and posterior lobes of the pituitary. It contains colloid-filled cysts and two types of cells - basophils and chromophobes. The cysts are the remainder of Rathke’s pouch. As technically part of the anterior pituitary, it separates the posterior pituitary and pars distalis. It is composed of large, pale cells that encompass the aforementioned colloid-filled follicles.

In human fetal life, this area produces melanocyte stimulating hormone or MSH which causes the release of melanin pigment in skin melanocytes (pigment cells). However, the pars intermedia is normally either very small or entirely absent in adulthood.

In lower vertebrates (fish, amphibians) MSH from the pars intermedia is responsible for darkening of the skin, often in response to changes in background color. This color change is due to MSH stimulating the dispersion of melanin pigment in dermal (skin) melanophore cells.

References

External links
 
 
 
 

Endocrine system
Human head and neck